31st Brigade or 31st Infantry Brigade may refer to:

 31st Brigade (Australia)
 31st Brigade (France)
 31st Mechanized Infantry Brigade (Greece)
 31st Indian Brigade of the British Indian Army in the First World War
 31st Indian Infantry Brigade of the British Indian Army in the Second World War
31st Mechanized Brigade (Soviet Union)
 31st Air Defense Artillery Brigade (United States)

 United Kingdom
 31st (North Midland) Anti-Aircraft Brigade
 31st Brigade (United Kingdom)

See also
 31st Division (disambiguation)
 31st Group (disambiguation)
 31st Regiment (disambiguation)
 31st Battalion (disambiguation)
 31st Squadron (disambiguation)